Sakdarin Mingsamorn (born February 10, 1988) is a Thai professional footballer who plays as a right-back.

Honour
Nongbua Pitchaya
 Thai League 2: 2020–21

External links

References

1988 births
Living people
Sakdarin Mingsamorn
Association football defenders
Samutsongkhram F.C. players
Sakdarin Mingsamorn
Sakdarin Mingsamorn
Sakdarin Mingsamorn